The small pedder galaxias (Galaxias parvus) or swamp galaxias, is a species of fish in the family Galaxiidae. It is endemic to Tasmania.

References

small pedder galaxias
Freshwater fish of Tasmania
Endemic fauna of Tasmania
small pedder galaxias
Taxonomy articles created by Polbot